The Rivière Cachée is a tributary of the Jacques-Cartier River, flowing in the administrative region of Capitale-Nationale, in Quebec, Canada. The course of the river crosses the unorganized territory of Lac-Jacques-Cartier in the La Côte-de-Beaupré Regional County Municipality, as well as the township municipality unis de Stoneham-et-Tewkesbury, located in the MRC La Jacques-Cartier Regional County Municipality.

The course of the river flows entirely in a forest zone in the Jacques-Cartier National Park which is affiliated with the Société des établissements de plein air du Québec (Sépaq).

The Cachée river valley is mainly served by the route 175 which links the towns of Quebec and Saguenay. A few secondary roads serve this area for forestry and recreational tourism activities.

Forestry is the main economic activity in the sector; recreational tourism, second.

The surface of the Cachée River (except the rapids areas) is generally frozen from the beginning of December to the end of March; safe circulation on the ice is generally done from the end of December to the beginning of March. The water level of the river varies with the seasons and the precipitation; the spring flood occurs in March or April.

Geography 
The Cachée river draws its source from Lac Caché, located in the unorganized territory of Lac-Jacques-Cartier, in the Laurentides Wildlife Reserve (at the eastern limit of Jacques-Cartier National Park), in the MRC of La Côte-de-Beaupré Regional County Municipality. This head lake is located between two mountains, on the southern slope of the watershed with the hydrographic slope of the Montmorency River.

From the mouth of the Cachée, the course of the Cachée river descends on  towards the southwest generally up to the Jacques-Cartier River with a drop of  according to the following segments:
  to the south in a deep valley, forming a loop to the northwest and another to the east, up to the two bridges of the route 175;
  to the south in a deep valley, more or less along route 175 to Bureau stream (coming from the east),
  to the south in a deep valley, more or less along route 175, up to the hamlet "Barrière-de-Stoneham";
  to the southwest in a deep valley, more or less along route 175 to Taché stream (coming from the southeast);

The Cachée river flows on the east bank of the Jacques-Cartier River, south of the Montagne de l'Épaule and opposite the Montagne de la Cachée. Facing this confluence, the hamlet Rivière-Cachée is located on the south bank of the Cachée river and on the east side of the Jacques-Cartier river. From this confluence, the current descends the Jacques-Cartier River for  generally south to the northeast bank of the St. Lawrence River.

Toponymy 
The 1852 map of provincial surveyor Frederic William Blaiklock mentions "River Caché". The traditional indigenous variant of the toponym is Taontaraseti, the name the Wendats use to speak of the Hidden River.

The toponym "Rivière Cachée" was formalized on December 5, 1968 at the Place Names Bank of the Commission de toponymie du Québec.

See also 

 Laurentides Wildlife Reserve
 Jacques-Cartier National Park
 Montagne de l'Épaule
 Montagne de la Cachée
 Lac-Jacques-Cartier, a TNO
 Stoneham-et-Tewkesbury, a municipality
 La Côte-de-Beaupré Regional County Municipality
 La Jacques-Cartier Regional County Municipality
 Jacques-Cartier River
 List of rivers of Quebec

Notes and references

Bibliography 
 .

Rivers of Capitale-Nationale
La Côte-de-Beaupré Regional County Municipality
La Jacques-Cartier Regional County Municipality
Laurentides Wildlife Reserve